Krasavino-2 is a rural locality (a village) in Kichmegnskoye Rural Settlement, Kichmengsko-Gorodetsky District, Vologda Oblast, Russia. The population was 39 as of 2002.

Geography 
Krasavino-2 is located 6 km northwest of Kichmengsky Gorodok (the district's administrative centre) by road. Nedubrovo is the nearest rural locality.

References 

Rural localities in Kichmengsko-Gorodetsky District